General elections were held in Bolivia in 1888. Aniceto Arce of the Conservative Party was elected President with 80% of the vote.

Background
In the 1884 elections, no presidential candidate won an absolute majority of the public vote, resulting in the President being elected by Congress. Gregorio Pacheco of the Democratic Party was elected after the Conservatives decided to support Pacheco. Their decision followed an agreement between Mariano Baptista of the Conservative Party and Jorge Oblitas and Casimiro Corral of the Liberal Party that Pacheco would work to support Conservative candidate Aniceto Arce in the next elections in 1888.

Results

President

References

Elections in Bolivia
Bolivia
1888 in Bolivia
Presidential elections in Bolivia
Election and referendum articles with incomplete results